The Castle of Turégano is an ancient fortress located in the town of Turégano in the province of Segovia, Spain. The castle was founded on the site of a pre-existing fortress. Its structure is integrated into the adjacent church of San Miguel.

In 1585 the castle was used to imprison Antonio Pérez, the then-disgraced secretary of king Philip II. An attempt by a group led by Álamos de Barrientos to free him from captivity here failed.

Turegano